The Latin Immigrant is a 1980 Colombian comedy film directed by Gustavo Nieto Roa. The film was selected as the Colombian entry for the Best Foreign Language Film at the 53rd Academy Awards, but was not accepted as a nominee.

Cast
 Carlos Benjumea
 Franky Linero

See also
 List of submissions to the 53rd Academy Awards for Best Foreign Language Film
 List of Colombian submissions for the Academy Award for Best Foreign Language Film

References

External links
 

1980 films
1980 comedy films
1980s Spanish-language films
Colombian comedy films